Sugarman is a surname. Notable people with the surname include:

 Burt Sugarman, American television producer
 George Sugarman, American artist
 Jeremy Sugarman, American bioethicist
 Jule Sugarman, American public administrator 
 Morris Henry Sugarman, American architect
 Richard Sugarman, American professor of religion, political advisor to Bernie Sanders
 Sara Sugarman, Welsh actress and film director 
 Stephen Sugarman, American law professor
 Tracy Sugarman, American graphic designer

Other uses 
 Sugarman syndrome, a common name for a human disease
 Sugarman: The Best of Rodriguez, a compilation album by Rodriguez (musician)
Two Yoo Project - Sugarman, a South Korean TV series
Sugarman Gang, an English burglary ring which operated during the early 1900s
 The Sugarman 3, an American retro-funk band formed by Neal Sugarman, Adam Scone, and Rudy Albin

See also
 Sugar Man (disambiguation)
 Sugerman, surname